Porphyreon was a town in the late Roman province of Phoenice Prima, and a bishopric that was a suffragan of the metropolitan see of that province, Tyre. It corresponds to present-day Jieh, Lebanon.

History

Porphyreon is described in the Notitia Episcopatuum of Antioch as belonging to the sixth century, but does not appear in that of the tenth century. Le Quien mentions five of its bishops:

Thomas, 451; 
Alexander, at the end of the fifth century; 
Theodore, 518; 
Christophorus, 536; 
and Paul (contemporary of Justinian II), 565-78.

There were two Porphyreons in this province. One, described by Scylax north of Sidon and also by Palerin of Bordeaux eight miles from Sidon, is now Jieh. A second Porphyreon, according to the Pseudo-Antoninus, may be located six or seven miles north of Carmel. Historians of the Crusades (William of Tyre and James of Vitry) confound this town with Caipha; the latter corresponds to the see. In fact Saint Simeon Stylite the Young, contemporary of Paul, Bishop of Porphyreon, affirms that the episcopal town may be found near Castra, a place inhabited by the Samaritans. Now, in the same epoch the Pseudo-Antoninus  locates the Castra Samaritanorum a Sucamina (Caipha) milliario subtus monte Carmelo south of Porphyreon.

The church of Porphyreon, dedicated to the Blessed Virgin, was built by Justinian I. The ruins of Porphyreon should be found near Belus, the Nahr Namein, in the sands of which may still be seen the murex brandaris and the murex trunculus (thorny shell fish), from which is extracted the famous purple dye of Tyre, and which gave its name to Porphyreon.

Notes

References
Attribution

External links
Catholic Hierarchy page

Catholic titular sees in Asia